Gholam Hoseyn-e Hafezi (also Romanized as Gholām Ḩoseyn-e Ḩāfez̧ī) is a village in Abezhdan Rural District, Abezhdan District, Andika County, Khuzestan Province, Iran. At the 2006 census, its population was 21, in 5 families.

References 

Populated places in Andika County